Deadly Game or Deadly Games may refer to:

Film and TV
A Deadly Game (1924 film), Austrian silent directed by Michael Curtiz
The Deadly Game (1941 film), American spy adventure
Deadly Game (1954 film), British crime drama, a/k/a Third Party Risk
Deadly Game, 1977 American TV film, starring Andy Griffith
A Deadly Game (1979 film), British TV spy adventure, a/k/a Charlie Muffin
The Deadly Game (1982 film), American-British TV philosophical thriller
Deadly Games (1982 film), an American slasher thriller
Deadly Game (1986 film), American suspense thriller, a/k/a The Manhattan Project
Deadly Games (1989 film), 1989 French horror thriller, original title 3615 code Père Noël
Deadly Game, 1991 American TV film starring Michael Beck
Deadly Games (TV series), 1995 American UPN science fiction TV series produced by Leonard Nimoy
Deadly Game, 1998 American TV film starring Tim Matheson, a/k/a Catch Me If You Can
A Deadly Game, May 17, 2010 season 2 finale of American TV series Castle 
The Deadly Game (2013 film), British crime thriller, a/k/a All Things to All Men

Other
Deadly Game, 1996 American novel (Christine Feehan bibliography)
Deadly Game, American professional wrestling event Survivor Series (1998)
Deadly Game (album), 2002 album by American rapper X-Raided